Coolidge v. New Hampshire, 403 U.S. 443 (1971), was a United States Supreme Court case dealing with the Fourth Amendment and the automobile exception.

The state sought to justify the search of a car owned by Edward Coolidge, suspected of killing 14-year-old Pamela Mason in January 1964, on three theories: automobile exception, search incident to arrest, and plain view.

Facts
14-year-old Pamela Mason of Manchester, New Hampshire placed an ad in the window of a local merchant offering to babysit. On January 13, 1964, she was picked up by a man who had called her, saying that he needed a babysitter. He picked her up to take her to the alleged babysitting location but she was never seen again. Eight days later, Mason was found stabbed and shot to death in a snowbank near Manchester, New Hampshire. The state Attorney General took charge of police activities relating to the murder. When the police applied for a warrant to search suspect Coolidge's automobile, the Attorney General, acting as a justice of the peace, authorized it. Additionally, local police had taken items from Coolidge's home during the course of an interview with the suspect's wife. Coolidge was found guilty and sentenced to life imprisonment.

Opinion of the Court
In a decision in which a number of justices chose to concur in part and dissent in part, the Court held that the searches and seizures of Coolidge's property were unconstitutional. Justice Stewart's opinion held that the warrant authorizing the seizure of Coolidge's automobile was invalid because it was not issued by a "neutral and detached magistrate." Justice Stewart also rejected New Hampshire's arguments in favor of making an exception to the warrant requirement. Justice Stewart held that neither the "incident to arrest" doctrine nor the "plain view" doctrine justified the search, and that an "automobile exception" was inapplicable. The Court noted that although the "automobile exception" exists, "the word 'automobile' is not a talisman in whose presence the fourth amendment fades away and disappears...".

Aftermath
Coolidge was released from prison in 1991 maintains his innocence in Mason's murder and the other murders he was suspected in.

References

Further reading
. 
https://www.oyez.org/cases/1970-1979/1970/1970_323

External links
 

1971 in United States case law
United States Supreme Court cases
United States Supreme Court cases of the Burger Court
United States Fourth Amendment case law
Legal history of New Hampshire